Grigorenko is a  transliteration variant of the Ukrainian family name Hyhorenko. It means "son of Grigori (Gregory)".

 Pyotr Grigorenko, Soviet general and dissident communist
 Igor Grigorenko, Russian professional ice hockey right winger
 Mikhail Grigorenko, Russian junior ice hockey centre
 Julia Grigorenko, Ukrainian ice dancer
 Paulina Grigorenko, Russian 1992 Amsterdam Marathon female winner

See also
 

Ukrainian-language surnames
Patronymic surnames
Surnames from given names